The 14th World Cup season began in December 1979 in France and concluded in March 1980 in Austria.

Andreas Wenzel of Liechtenstein edged out Ingemar Stenmark of Sweden for the men's overall title. Wenzel's older sister, Hanni Wenzel, won the women's overall title for the second time, making them the first sibling combination to both win the overall World Cup title (as of 2017, joined only by Janica and Ivica Kostelić from Croatia) and the only one to win in the same year.

The World Cup race scoring system was revised again, the third different system used in less than a year.  The new system was a "Top 15" points system (ranging from 25 points for first, 20 for second, 15 for third, 12 for fourth, and 1 point less for each subsequent position down to 1 point for 15th).  This system remained in effect through 1991.  The season championship for the "Combined" discipline also returned this year, for the first time since 1976.

A break in the schedule in February was for the 1980 Winter Olympics in Lake Placid, New York, U.S.A. This was the final time that the Winter Olympics also served as the FIS Alpine World Ski Championships; the World Championships would become a separate competition held in odd-numbered years beginning in 1985.

Calendar

Men

Ladies

Men

Overall 

see complete table

In Men's Overall World Cup 1979/80 the best four downhills, best four giant slaloms, best four slaloms and best three combined count. 27 racers had a point deduction. Ingemar Stenmark had 128 points deduction and won 11 races. Andreas Wenzel was able to collect points in all disciplines by winning three events and had only 8 points deduction.

Downhill 

see complete table

In Men's Downhill World Cup 1979/80 the best 5 results count. Seven racers had a point deduction, which are given in brackets.

Giant Slalom 

see complete table

In Men's Giant Slalom World Cup 1979/80 the best 5 results count. Eight racers had a point deduction, which are given in brackets. Ingemar Stenmark won the cup with maximum points. He won his fifth Giant Slalom World Cup (third in a row).

Slalom 

see complete table

In Men's Slalom World Cup 1979/80 the best 5 results count. Six racers had a point deduction, which are given in brackets. Ingemar Stenmark won the cup with maximum points. He won his sixth Slalom World Cup in a row!

Combined 

see complete table

After the season 1975/76 this was the second time, that a Combined World Cup was awarded. All four results count.

Ladies

Overall 

see complete table

In Women's Overall World Cup 1979/80 the best four downhills, best four giant slaloms, best four slaloms and best three combined count. 23 racers had a point deduction. Hanni Wenzel had a total deduction of 158 points. She won nine competitions and was unable to score points only in one event! (The first slalom at Vysoké Tatry.)

Downhill 

see complete table

In Women's Downhill World Cup 1979/80 the best 5 results count. Seven racers had a point deduction, which are given in brackets. Marie-Theres Nadig won 6 races out of 7 and won the World Cup with maximum points.

Giant Slalom 

see complete table

In Women's Giant Slalom World Cup 1978/79 the best 5 results count. Six racers had a point deduction, which are given in brackets. Hanni Wenzel won five races in a row. She won the World Cup with maximum points.

Slalom 

see complete table

In Women's Slalom World Cup 1979/80 the best 5 results count. 8 racers had a point deduction, which are given in brackets.

Combined 

see complete table

After the season 1975/76 this was the second time, that a Combined World Cup was awarded. All four results count.

Nations Cup

Overall

Men

Ladies

References

External links
FIS-ski.com - World Cup standings - 1980

FIS Alpine Ski World Cup
World Cup
World Cup